Las Adjuntas is a common station shared by two Venezuelan metro lines of the Caracas Metro and the Los Teques Metro. The station has two platforms that are connected by three pedestrian overpasses. Each platform serves up to two trains from their respective metro lines. The metro station was opened on 4 October 1987 as part of the inaugural section of Line 2 from La Paz to Las Adjuntas and Zoológico. The adjacent station is Ruiz Pineda.

References

Caracas Metro stations
1987 establishments in Venezuela
Railway stations opened in 1987